Krisztián Tiber (born 6 October 1972 in Hungary) is a Hungarian retired footballer.

References

1972 births
Living people
Hungarian footballers
Fehérvár FC players
Gázszer FC footballers
Vasas SC players
Debreceni VSC players
FC Sopron players
Association football forwards